The canton of Saint-Étienne-3 (before 2015: Saint-Étienne-Nord-Ouest-2) is a French administrative division located in the department of Loire and the Auvergne-Rhône-Alpes region. It has the following communes:
Roche-la-Molière
Saint-Étienne (partly)
Saint-Genest-Lerpt

See also
Cantons of the Loire department

References

Cantons of Loire (department)